The 1970–71 Utah Stars season was the first season for the Stars in Utah. After one season in Anaheim and two seasons in Los Angeles, the team moved to Utah in June 1970. The Stars finished second in the Western Division and won their first and only ABA title. In the Semifinals, the Stars swept the Texas Chaparrals in four games. In the Division Finals, they beat the Indiana Pacers in seven games (including Game 7 in Indiana) to advance to the ABA Finals. In seven games, they beat the Kentucky Colonels, to give the state of Utah its first pro championship.

Roster
10 Mervin Jackson (Point guard, University of Utah)
11 Dick Nemelka (Shooting guard, Brigham Young University)
12 Mike Butler (Shooting guard, University of Memphis)
14 Roderick McDonald (Power Forward, Whitworth)
20 Donnie Freeman (Shooting guard, University of Illinois at Urbana–Champaign)
21 Red Robbins (Power forward, University of Tennessee)
22 Tom Workman (Forward/Center, Seattle University)
23 Jeffrey Congdon (Point guard, Brigham Young University)
24 Ron Boone (Shooting guard, Idaho State University)
31 Zelmo Beaty (Center, Prairie View A&M University)
33 George Stone (Small forward, Marshall University)
35 Wayne Hightower (Power forward, University of Kansas)
40 Glen Combs (Shooting guard, Virginia Polytechnic Institute and State University)
42 Willie Wise (Small forward, Drake University)
54 Sam Smith (Small forward, Kentucky Wesleyan College)

Bold indicates the player was on the final roster prior to the playoffs.

Season standings

Playoffs
Western Division Semifinals

Stars win series, 4–0

Division Finals

Stars win series, 4–3

ABA Finals

Stars win series, 4–3

Zelmo Beaty scored 23.2 points per game and rebounded 14.6 rebounds per game, which earned him the Playoffs MVP.

Awards, records, and honors
1971 ABA All-Star Game
Zelmo Beaty
Glen Combs
Red Robbins
Ron Boone

References

External links

Utah
American Basketball Association championship seasons
Utah Stars seasons
Utah Stars
Utah Stars